The 1925 Daniel Baker Hillbillies football team represented Daniel Baker College as a member of the Texas Intercollegiate Athletic Association (TIAA) during the 1925 college football season. Led by Shorty Ransom in his first season as head coach, the team compiled and overall record of 2–6–2 with a mark of 0–4–2 in TIAA play.

Schedule

References

Daniel Baker
Daniel Baker Hillbillies football seasons
Daniel Baker Hillbillies football